Nelson Howarth (1904–1945) was an English footballer who played in the Football League for Bolton Wanderers and West Bromwich Albion.

References

1904 births
1945 deaths
English footballers
Association football midfielders
English Football League players
Bolton Wanderers F.C. players
West Bromwich Albion F.C. players
Runcorn F.C. Halton players
Loughborough Corinthians F.C. players